The All-American Baseball Challenge was a six-team recreational baseball league formed in July 2020 in the New York City metropolitan area. Local ownership quickly organized this pop-up league in response to the cancellation of the 2020 Frontier League season, which was to feature three of the teams involved, due to the continued COVID-19 pandemic.

Games were played at Yogi Berra Stadium in Little Falls, New Jersey, Skylands Stadium in Augusta, New Jersey, and Palisades Credit Union Park in Pomona, New York. Each stadium featured two teams, which included the New Jersey Jackals and Sussex County Miners each playing in their home parks. The owners of the New York Boulders also fielded a team in their stadium, but the team kept the franchise’s former name of Rockland Boulders for the season.

Major leaguers Vin Mazzaro and Taylor Motter played in the league.

Teams

The league features players from independent, affiliated minor league, and college baseball.

Rules
Initially, a 32 game, 8-week regular season was reported, but as games not played due to inclement weather were canceled, teams wound up playing fewer games. All games were scheduled for 7 innings and are held on Thursday, Friday, Saturday, and Sunday.

Contests tied after 7 innings used a home run derby to decide the winning team. A player on each team took five batting practice swings and the player with more home runs won the game for his team.

GameChanger was the official scoring/statistical tracking platform for the league.

Season Results

AABC Championship - Playoff Bracket

Round 1 Sept. 11, 2020

Results:

1 seed vs. 4 seed at Skylands Stadium,
New York Brave 5  Sussex County Miners 1

2 seed vs. 3 seed at Palisades Credit Union Park, New Jersey Jackals 11  Rockland Boulders 2

5 seed vs. 6 seed at Yogi Berra Stadium,
Jersey Wise Guys 3,  Skylands Cardinals 0

Round 2 Sept. 12, 2020

Championship game at Yogi Berra Stadium,
New Jersey Jackals 3   New York Brave 2

3rd place game at Skylands Stadium,
Sussex County Miners 5  Jersey Wise Guys 1

5th place game at Palisades Credit Union Park,
Skylands Cardinals 7  Rockland Boulders 6

Postseason notes:
Highest seed is the home team.

References

Independent baseball leagues in the United States
Baseball leagues in New Jersey
Baseball leagues in New York (state)
Sports leagues established in 2020
2020 establishments in New Jersey
2020 establishments in New York (state)